Adrian Ungur took the title, beating qualifier Antonio Veić 6–1, 6–0

Seeds

Draw

Finals

Top half

Bottom half

References
 Main Draw
 Qualifying Draw

San Marino GOandFUN Open - Singles
San Marino GO&FUN Open